Mathias Morris (September 12, 1787 – November 9, 1839) was an American politician from Pennsylvania who served as an Anti-Jacksonian and Whig member of the U.S. House of Representatives for Pennsylvania's 6th congressional district from 1835 to 1839.

Early life and education
Mathias Morris was born in Hilltown, Pennsylvania.  He attended the public schools in Newtown and Doylestown, Pennsylvania.  He studied law, was admitted to the bar in 1809 and commenced practice in Newtown, Pennsylvania.

Career
He was deputy attorney general in 1819, and a member of the Pennsylvania State Senate for the 5th district from 1828 to 1833.

He elected as an Anti-Jacksonian to the Twenty-fourth Congress and reelected as a Whig to the Twenty-fifth Congresses.  He was the chairman of the United States House Committee on Expenditures in the Department of State during the Twenty-fifth Congress.  He was an unsuccessful candidate for reelection in 1838 to the Twenty-sixth Congress.

He died in Doylestown, Pennsylvania and is interred in the Hilltown Baptist Churchyard in Chalfont, Pennsylvania.

Notes

Sources

The Political Graveyard

|-

1787 births
1839 deaths
Burials in Pennsylvania
Pennsylvania state senators
Pennsylvania National Republicans
National Republican Party members of the United States House of Representatives
Whig Party members of the United States House of Representatives from Pennsylvania
19th-century American politicians